Kashmir Chamber Of Commerce and Industries  also known as (KCCI)  is an apex trade body which is almost eighty five year old established in 1934 headquartered at srinagar  Jammu & Kashmir

References

 Chambers of commerce
Economy of Jammu and Kashmir
1934 establishments in India
Trade associations based in India
Chambers of commerce in India
Ministry of Micro, Small and Medium Enterprises
Non-profit organisations based in India
Organisations based in Jammu and Kashmir
Organizations established in 1934